Jack Stephen Burroughs (born 21 March 2001) is a professional footballer who plays as a defender for Coventry City. Born in England, he represents Scotland internationally at youth level.

Career
Burroughs started his career in the youth system at Coventry City before making his debut in an EFL Trophy game against Forest Green Rovers coming on as a 62nd minute substitute for Jak Hickman.
Making his debut Jack became the first player born in this millennium to represent Coventry City. 
A week later, Jack signed his first professional contract at the club, joining on a two-year deal.

In December 2019, Jack joined Nuneaton Borough on a one-month loan deal. A year later he went on loan to Gloucester City for a month.

On 6 August 2021 Burroughs joined Scottish Premiership side Ross County on a season long loan.

International career
Burroughs was selected for the Scotland under-19 team in January 2019, making his debut 17 February against Azerbaijan in a 2–0 win. His younger brother George Burroughs was also selected for Scotland a week later and made his debut on 8 February against Hungary under-17's in a 2–1 victory.

Jack scored his first goal for Scotland U19's against Turkey U19's in a 2019 UEFA European Under-19 Championship qualification match.

In May 2021, he received his first call-up to the Scotland U21's to face Northern Ireland U21 in June 2021.

Career statistics

References

2001 births
Living people
Scottish footballers
Scotland youth international footballers
English footballers
English people of Scottish descent
Coventry City F.C. players
Nuneaton Borough F.C. players
Gloucester City A.F.C. players
Southern Football League players
National League (English football) players
Association football midfielders
Scotland under-21 international footballers
Ross County F.C. players
Scottish Professional Football League players